The gin pennant (sometimes gin flag or drinking pennant) is a maritime flag.  When flown aboard ship, it indicates an open invitation to other ships' officers to come aboard for drinks.

Purpose and history 
The gin pennant appeared at least as early as the 1940s, and possibly long before.  Flying the gin pennant was an invitation (generally aimed at officers) to come aboard for a (free) drink in the ship's wardroom.  (Consequently, junior officers would sometimes compete and conspire to fly the gin pennant aboard other ships.)  Gin pennants likely originated in, and remain in use today, in the Commonwealth navies.

Form 

The gin pennant exists in several variants.  Due to their rather informal nature, gin pennants may be improvised or customized from available flags and pennants.  The simplest option is to fly the "starboard" manoeuvering signal pennant (a pennant with a white field, and green hoist and fly).

Purpose-made gin pennants often take the form of a starboard pennant defaced with a wine, cocktail, or martini glass (typically green, sometimes gray or black) on the field.

Another variant described is a small triangular flag in solid green, defaced with a white cocktail or wine glass.

Gin pennants have also been produced as novelties by distillers. In the 1950s, the makers of Gordon's Gin distributed Gordon's pennants in reversed colors: a green field with white hoist and fly, defaced with a gin bottle, glass, and the word GORDON'S.

References

External links 

 Photo Crew of the USS Gunnel display their gin pennant on Midway Island, 11 January 1944
 Gin Flag Naval Traditions About Flags 
 British Gin Pennant Flags of the World
 Flag Signalling at Sea Barry Kent, proceedings of The XIX International Congress of Vexillology

Maritime flags